Obstructive sleep apnea (OSA) is the most common sleep-related breathing disorder and is characterized by recurrent episodes of complete or partial obstruction of the upper airway leading to reduced or absent breathing during sleep. These episodes are termed "apneas" with complete or near-complete cessation of breathing, or "hypopneas" when the reduction in breathing is partial. In either case, a fall in blood oxygen saturation, a disruption in sleep, or both may result. A high frequency of apneas or hypopneas during sleep may interfere with restorative sleep, whichin combination with disturbances in blood oxygenationis thought to contribute to negative consequences to health and quality of life. The terms obstructive sleep apnea syndrome (OSAS) or obstructive sleep apnea–hypopnea syndrome (OSAHS) may be used to refer to OSA when it is associated with symptoms during the daytime (e.g. excessive daytime sleepiness, decreased cognitive function).

Most individuals with OSA are unaware of disturbances in breathing while sleeping, even after awakening. A bed partner or family member may observe an individual snoring or appear to stop breathing, gasp, or choke while sleeping. Individuals who live or sleep alone are often unaware of the condition. Symptoms may be present for years or even decades without identification, during which time the individual may become conditioned to the daytime sleepiness, headaches and fatigue associated with significant levels of sleep disturbance. Obstructive sleep apnea has been associated with neurocognitive morbidity, as well as a link between snoring and neurocognitive disorders.

Classification
In the third edition of the International Classification of Sleep Disorders (ICSD-3), obstructive sleep apnea is classified amongst the sleep-related breathing disorders and is divided in two categories, namely adult OSA and pediatric OSA. Obstructive sleep apnea is differentiated from central sleep apnea (CSA), which is characterized by episodes of reduction or cessation in breathing attributable to decreased effort, rather than upper airway obstruction. The respiratory effort must then be assessed in order to correctly classify the apnea as obstructive given the specificity of the diaphragmatic activity in this condition: the inspiratory effort is continued or increased through the entire episode of absent airflow. 

When hypopneas are present alongside apneas, the term obstructive sleep apnea-hypopnea is used and when it is associated with daytime sleepiness and other daytime symptoms, it is called obstructive sleep apnea-hypopnea syndrome. To be categorized as obstructive, the hypopnea must meet one or more of the following symptoms: (1) snoring during the event, (2) increased oronasal flow flattening, or (3) thoraco-abdominal paradoxical respiration during the event. If none of them are present during the event, then it is categorized as central hypopnea.

Signs and symptoms
Common symptoms of OSA syndrome include unexplained daytime sleepiness, restless sleep, and loud snoring (with periods of silence followed by gasps). Less common symptoms are morning headaches; insomnia; trouble concentrating; mood changes such as irritability, anxiety, and depression; forgetfulness; increased heart rate or blood pressure; decreased sex drive; unexplained weight gain; increased urinary frequency or nocturia; frequent heartburn or gastroesophageal reflux; and heavy night sweats.

Many people experience episodes of OSA for only a short period. This can be the result of an upper respiratory infection that causes nasal congestion, along with swelling of the throat, or tonsillitis that temporarily produces very enlarged tonsils. The Epstein-Barr virus, for example, is known to be able to dramatically increase the size of lymphoid tissue during acute infection, and OSA is fairly common in acute cases of severe infectious mononucleosis. Temporary spells of OSA syndrome may also occur in individuals who are under the influence of a drug (such as alcohol) that may relax their body tone excessively and interfere with normal arousal from sleep mechanisms.

Adults
The hallmark symptom of OSA syndrome in adults is excessive daytime sleepiness. Typically, an adult or adolescent with severe long-standing OSA will fall asleep for very brief periods in the course of usual daytime activities if given an opportunity to sit or rest. This behavior may be quite dramatic, sometimes occurring during conversations with others at social gatherings.

The hypoxia (absence of oxygen supply) related to OSA may cause changes in the neurons of the hippocampus and the right frontal cortex. Research using neuro-imaging revealed evidence of hippocampal atrophy in people with OSA. They found that OSA can cause problems in mentally manipulating non-verbal information, in executive functions and working memory. This repeated brain hypoxia is also considered to be a cause of Alzheimer's disease.

Diagnosis of obstructive sleep apnea is significantly more common among people in relationships, who are alerted to their condition by being informed by their sleeping partner since individuals with obstructive sleep apnea are often unaware of the condition. There is a stigma associated with loud snoring, and it is not considered a feminine trait. Consequently, females are less likely to be told by their partners that they snore, or to admit it to themselves or doctors. Furthermore, CPAP (Continuous Positive Airway Pressure) machines are also perceived negatively by females, and less likely to be utilized to their full extent in this group.

Children
Although this so-called "hypersomnolence" (excessive sleepiness) may also occur in children, it is not at all typical of young children with sleep apnea. Toddlers and young children with severe OSA instead ordinarily behave as if "over-tired" or "hyperactive"; and usually appear to have behavioral problems like irritability, and a deficit in attention. 

Adults and children with very severe OSA also differ in typical body habitus. Adults are generally heavy, with particularly short and heavy necks. Young children, on the other hand, are generally not only thin but may have "failure to thrive", where growth is reduced. Poor growth occurs for two reasons: the work of breathing is intense enough that calories are burned at high rates even at rest, and the nose and throat are so obstructed that eating is both tasteless and physically uncomfortable. OSA in children, unlike adults, is often caused by obstructive tonsils and adenoids and may sometimes be cured with tonsillectomy and adenoidectomy.

This problem can also be caused by excessive weight in children. In this case, the symptoms are more like the symptoms adults feel such as restlessness, exhaustion, etc. If adenotonsillar hypertrophy remains the most common cause of OSA in children, obesity can also play a role in the pathophysiology of upper airway obstruction during sleep which can lead to OSA, making obese children more likely to develop the condition. The recent epidemic increase of obesity prevalence has thus contributed to changes in the prevalence and in the characteristics of pediatric OSA, the severity of OSA being proportional to the degree of obesity. 

Obesity leads to the narrowing of upper airway structure due to fatty infiltration and fat deposits in the anterior neck region and cervical structures. Alongside with the additional weight loading on the respiratory system, it increases the risk of pharyngeal collapsibility while reducing the intrathoracic volume and diaphragm excursion. Moreover, excessive daytime sleepiness resulting from sleep fragmentation can decrease physical activity and thus lead to weight gain (by sedentary habits or increased food intake to overcome somnolence). The obesity-related obstruction of upper airway structure has led some authors to distinguish between two types of OSA in children: type I is associated with marked lymphadenoid hypertrophy without obesity and type II is first associated with obesity and with milder upper airway lymphadenoid hyperplasia. The two types of OSA in children can results in different morbidities and consequences. Studies have shown that weight loss in obese adolescents can reduce sleep apnea and thus the symptoms of OSA.

Pathophysiology

The transition from wakefulness to sleep (either REM sleep or NREM sleep) is associated with a reduction in upper-airway muscle tone. During REM sleep, muscle tone of the throat and neck, as well as that of the vast majority of skeletal muscles, are almost completely relaxed. This allows the tongue and soft palate/oropharynx to relax, reducing airway patency and potentially impeding or completely obstructing the flow of air into the lungs during inspiration, resulting in reduced respiratory ventilation. If reductions in ventilation are associated with sufficiently low blood-oxygen levels or with sufficiently high breathing efforts against an obstructed airway, neurological mechanisms may trigger a sudden interruption of sleep, called a neurological arousal. This arousal can cause an individual to gasp for air and awaken. These arousals rarely result in complete awakening but can have a significant negative effect on the restorative quality of sleep. In significant cases of OSA, one consequence is sleep deprivation resulting from the repetitive disruption and recovery of sleep activity. This sleep interruption in Stage 3 (also called slow-wave sleep), and in REM sleep, can interfere with normal growth patterns, healing and immune response, especially in children and young adults.

The fundamental cause of OSA is a blocked upper airway, usually behind the tongue and epiglottis, whereby the otherwise patent airway, in an erect and awake patient, collapses when the patient is lying on his or her back and loses muscle tone upon entering deep sleep.

At the beginning of sleep, a patient is in light sleep and there is no tone loss of throat muscles. Airflow is laminar and soundless. As the upper airway collapse progresses, the obstruction becomes increasingly apparent by the initiation of noisy breathing as air turbulence increases, followed by gradually louder snoring as a Venturi effect forms through the ever-narrowing air passage.

The patient's blood-oxygen saturation gradually falls until cessation of sleep noises, signifying total airway obstruction of airflow, which may last for several minutes.

Eventually, the patient must at least partially awaken from deep sleep into light sleep, automatically regaining general muscle tone. This switch from deep to light to deep sleep can be recorded using ECT monitors.

In light sleep, muscle tone is near normal, the airway spontaneously opens, normal noiseless breathing resumes and blood-oxygen saturation rises. Eventually, the patient reenters deep sleep, upper airway tone is again lost, the patient enters the various levels of noisy breathing and the airway blockage returns.

The cycle of muscle-tone loss and restoration coinciding with periods of deep and light sleep repeats throughout the patient's period of sleep.

The number of apnoea and hypopnoea episodes during any given hour is counted and given a score. If a patient has an average of five or more episodes per hour, mild OSA may be confirmed. An average of 30 or more episodes per hour indicates severe OSA.

Pathophysiological models
The causes of spontaneous upper-airway blockage are strongly debated by clinical professionals. The areas of thought are divided mostly into three medical groups.

Some pulmonologists and neurologists believe the risk factors to be: 
 Advanced age, although OSA occurs in neonates, as with Pierre Robin syndrome, and in all age groups of people.
 Brain injury (temporary or permanent), although this does not account for the 99% of OSA patients who have normal brains and normal lives.
 Decreased muscle tone caused by drugs or alcohol, or caused by neurological disorders. This also would not account for the majority of people with OSA.
 Long-term snoring, which is postulated to potentially induce local nerve lesions in the soft tissues of the pharynx. Snoring may produce traumatic vibrations that may give rise to nerve injuries in the upper airway muscles, further contributing to OSA.
 Increased soft tissue around the airway, often resulting from obesity, though not seen in all patients with OSA.

Some otorhinolaryngologists believe the risk factors to be structural features that give rise to a narrowed airway, such as enlarged tonsils, an enlarged posterior tongue or fat deposits in the neck. Further factors leading to OSA can be impaired nasal breathing, floppy soft palate or a collapsible epiglottis.

Some oral and maxillofacial surgeons believe the risk factors to be a number of primary forms of mandibular hypoplasia, which offers a primary anatomical basis to the development of OSA through glossoptosis. Some maxillofacial surgeons who offer orthognathic surgery for treatment of OSA believe that their treatments offer superior guarantees of cure of OSA.

Risk factors

Obesity 
It is well known that children, adolescents or adults with OSA are often obese. Obese people show an increase in neck fat tissue which potentiate respiratory obstruction during sleep.

However, people of all ages and sex with normal body mass indices (BMIs) can also demonstrate OSA – and these people do not have significant measures of subdermal or intra neck fat as shown on DEXA scans. It is speculated that they may have increased muscle mass, or alternatively have a tendency to decreased muscle tone potentiating airway collapse during sleep.

However, loss of muscle tone is a key feature of deep sleep anyway, and whilst obesity seems a common association, it is not an invariable state of OSA.

Sleeping supine (on one's back) is also represented as a risk factor for OSA. Clearly, gravity and loss of tongue and throat tone as a person enters deep sleep are clear and obvious factors contributing to OSA developing. But this explanation is also confounded by the presence of neck obesity.

Use of CPAP definitively primarily expands a collapsed upper airway, allowing for nasal breathing – and positive use of CPAP would prove that airway collapse is the cause of OSA.

Throat lesions, particularly enlarged tonsils, are well recognized as aggravators of OSA, and removal may provide full or partial or semi-permanent relief from OSA, which also indicates that enlarged tonsils may play a role in the pathogenesis of OSA.

Age
Old age is often accompanied by muscular and neurological loss of muscle tone of the upper airway. Decreased muscle tone is also temporarily caused by chemical depressants; alcoholic drinks and sedative medications being the most common. Permanent premature muscular tonal loss in the upper airway may be precipitated by traumatic brain injury, neuromuscular disorders, or poor adherence to chemical and or speech therapy treatments.

Muscle tone 
Individuals with decreased muscle tone and increased soft tissue around the airway, and structural features that give rise to a narrowed airway are at high risk for OSA. Men, in which the anatomy is typified by increased mass in the torso and neck, are at increased risk of developing sleep apnea, especially through middle age and later.  Typically, women experience this condition less frequently and to a lesser degree than do men, owing partially to physiology, but possibly also to differential levels of progesterone.  Prevalence in post-menopausal women approaches that of men in the same age range. Women are at greater risk for developing OSA during pregnancy.

Medication and lifestyle 
Lifestyle factors such as smoking may also increase the chances of developing OSA as the chemical irritants in smoke tend to inflame the soft tissue of the upper airway and promote fluid retention, both of which can result in narrowing of the upper airway. Cigarettes may also have an impact due to a decline of blood nicotine levels, which alters sleep stability. Smokers thus show a higher risk to develop OSA, but the effect of cigarettes on increased OSA is reversible with the cessation of smoking. Children exposed to cigarette smoke may also develop OSA as the lymphadenoid tissue will proliferate excessively in contact with the irritants. An individual may also experience or exacerbate OSA with the consumption of alcohol, sedatives, or any other medication that increases sleepiness as most of these drugs are also muscle relaxants. Allergic rhinitis and asthma have also been shown to be implicated in the increased prevalence of adenotonsillar hypertrophy and OSA.

Genetic 
OSA also appears to have a genetic component; those with a family history of it are more likely to develop it themselves.

Craniofacial syndromes
Of substantial recent interest is the idea that there is a general human tendency towards developing short lower jaws (neoteny) is a major cause of OSA through a combined condition called glossoptosis. The posterior “normal” tongue is displaced backwards by a smaller “abnormal” anterior tongue and lower jaw. In much the same way, a narrow upper jaw will also contribute to OSA due to its relation to airway volume. A more narrow upper jaw results in more narrow nasal passages and a more narrow throat, this also appears to be why so many OSA patients experience nasal congestion especially while lying down.

Maxillofacial surgeons see many effects of small lower jaws, including crowded teeth, malocclusions, as well as OSA – all of which are treatable by surgical operations that increase and normalise jaw size. Operations such as custom BIMAX, GenioPaully, and IMDO (in adolescence) offer a valid medical option that replaces all traditional forms of OSA treatment – including CPAP, Mandibular Advancement Splints, tonsillectomy and UPPP. There are patterns of unusual facial features that occur in recognizable syndromes. Some of these craniofacial syndromes are genetic, others are from unknown causes. In many craniofacial syndromes, the features that are unusual involve the nose, mouth, and jaw, or resting muscle tone, and put the individual at risk for OSA syndrome.

Down syndrome is one such syndrome. In this chromosomal abnormality, several features combine to make the presence of obstructive sleep apnea more likely. The specific features of Down syndrome that predispose to obstructive sleep apnea include relatively low muscle tone, narrow nasopharynx, and large tongue. Obesity and enlarged tonsils and adenoids, conditions that occur commonly in the western population, are much more likely to be obstructive in a person with these features than without them. Obstructive sleep apnea does occur even more frequently in people with Down syndrome than in the general population. A little over 50% of all people with Down syndrome experience obstructive sleep apnea, and some physicians advocate routine testing of this group.

In other craniofacial syndromes, the abnormal feature may actually improve the airway, but its correction may put the person at risk for obstructive sleep apnea after surgery when it is modified. Cleft palate syndromes are such an example. During the newborn period, all humans are obligate nasal breathers. The palate is both the roof of the mouth and the floor of the nose. Having an open palate may make feeding difficult, but generally, does not interfere with breathing, in fact, if the nose is very obstructed, then an open palate may relieve breathing. There are a number of clefting syndromes in which the open palate is not the only abnormal feature; additionally, there is a narrow nasal passage – which may not be obvious. In such individuals, closure of the cleft palate – whether by surgery or by a temporary oral appliance – can cause the onset of obstruction.

Skeletal advancement in an effort to physically increase the pharyngeal airspace is often an option for craniofacial patients with upper airway obstruction and small lower jaws (mandibles). These syndromes include Treacher Collins syndrome and Pierre Robin sequence. Mandibular advancement surgery is one of the modifications needed to improve the airway, others may include reduction of the tongue, tonsillectomy or modified uvulopalatoplasty.

Post-operative complication 
OSA can also occur as a serious post-operative complication that seems to be most frequently associated with pharyngeal flap surgery as compared to other procedures for the treatment of velopharyngeal inadequacy (VPI). In OSA, recurrent interruptions of respiration during sleep are associated with temporary airway obstruction. Following pharyngeal flap surgery, depending on size and position, the flap itself may have an "obturator" or obstructive effect within the pharynx during sleep, blocking ports of airflow and hindering effective respiration. There have been documented instances of severe airway obstruction, and reports of post-operative OSA continues to increase as healthcare professionals (i.e. physicians, speech language pathologists) become more educated about this possible dangerous condition. Subsequently, in clinical practice, concerns of OSA have matched or exceeded interest in speech outcomes following pharyngeal flap surgery.

The surgical treatment for velopalatal insufficiency may cause obstructive sleep apnea syndrome. When velopalatal insufficiency is present, air leaks into the nasopharynx even when the soft palate should close off the nose. A simple test for this condition can be made by placing a tiny mirror on the nose, and asking the subject to say "P". This p sound, a plosive, is normally produced with the nasal airway closes off – all air comes out of the pursed lips, none from the nose. If it is impossible to say the sound without fogging a nasal mirror, there is an air leak – reasonable evidence of poor palatal closure. Speech is often unclear due to inability to pronounce certain sounds. One of the surgical treatments for velopalatal insufficiency involves tailoring the tissue from the back of the throat and using it to purposefully cause partial obstruction of the opening of the nasopharynx. This may actually cause OSA syndrome in susceptible individuals, particularly in the days following surgery, when swelling occurs (see below: Special Situation: Anesthesia and Surgery).

Finally, patients with OSA are at an increased risk of many perioperative complications when they are present for surgery, even if the planned procedure is not on the head and neck. Guidelines intended to reduce the risk of perioperative complications have been published.

Consequences

There are 3 levels of consequences: physiologic, intermediate and clinical. The physiologic consequences contain hypoxia, sleep fragmentation, autonomic nervous system dysregulation or hyperoxia. The intermediate results regroup inflammation, pulmonary vasoconstriction, general metabolic dysfunction, oxidation of proteins and lipids or increased adiposity. The clinical repercussions are composed by pulmonary hypertension, accidents, obesity, diabetes, different heart diseases or hypertension.

In children
Obstructive sleep apnea is the most common Sleep-Disordered Breathing (SDB) and affects up to 11% of children born at term – it is even more common (3 to 6 times more) in children born pre-term. As a SDB, OSA in children can lead to several adverse consequences, also in the long-term with consequences lasting into adulthood. The implications of OSA in children are complex and cover a large scope of consequences: when it is left untreated, OSA can lead to morbidity affecting many different domains of life (organs, body systems, behavioral disturbance, depression, decreased quality of life, etc.). Therefore, nocturnal symptoms indicating the presence of OSA (e.g. snoring, gasping, restless sleep and excessive energy used to breathe during sleep) are associated with daytime symptoms such as concentration and learning difficulties and irritability, neurocognitive development impairment, decreased school performance and behavioral difficulties. For example, SDB such as OSA contributes to hyperactive behavior that can lead to the diagnosis and treatment of attention deficit hyperactivity disorder (ADHD). However, once the SDB is treated, the hyperactive behavior can improve, and the treatment can be stopped. Obesity also has an impact on the consequences of OSA and lead to different manifestations or severity. Studies have shown that, contrary to adults, children with obstructive sleep-disordered breathing are able to maintain cerebral oxygenation. However, the condition still has effects on the brain and can lead to adverse neurocognitive and behavioral sequelae. It is particularly concerning as those consequences happen while the brain is still developing. The degree to which the sleep is disturbed and fragmented has been significantly linked to the severity of the consequences, the latter having the possibility to decrease once the sleep is improved. It is more the disruption of sleep processes than the total amount of sleep the child experience that generates the adverse consequences on the child's daytime functioning; it contributes to the hyperactivity for example.

Children with OSA may experience learning and memory deficits and OSA has also been linked to lowered childhood IQ scores.

Neurocognitive and behavioral consequences
Nocturnal sleep fragmentation has been linked to neurocognitive impairments, therefore, the identification of SDB such as OSA is crucial in children, those impairments having the possibility to be reversible with the appropriate treatment for the sleep disorder. The neurocognitive and behavioral dysfunctions commonly present in children with OSA include the following: hyperactivity, impulsivity, aggressive behaviors, low social and communication abilities and reduced adaptive skills. 
Children with OSA commonly show cognitive deficits, resulting in attention and concentration difficulties, as well as lower academic performance and IQ. Poor academic performances have been linked to OSA and suggested to result from cortical and sympathetic arousals and hypoxemia which affects memory consolidation. A study with Indian children affected by OSA has shown poor school grades, including mathematics, science, language and physical education. This study allowed to see the overall impact of OSA on learning abilities associated with language or numeracy skills, and physical development. It has been suggested that the deficits in academic performance related to OSA could be mediated through reduced executive functions or language skills, those domains contributing highly to learning abilities and behavior. The deficits in school performance can nevertheless be improved if adenotonsillectomy is performed on children to treat the OSA. It is thus crucial to identify the OSA for children with school difficulties; many cases remaining unnoticed.

As studies have shown that learning skills and behaviors can be improved if the OSA is treated, the neurocognitive and behavioral deficits are thus at least partly reversible. This reversible dimension has been postulated to be negatively correlated to the duration of the symptoms, which would mean that the longer the OSA is left untreated, the less reversible are the consequences.

Somatic and metabolic consequences
Similarly to adults, OSA in children is linked to a higher risk for cardiovascular morbidities, due to increased sympathetic activity and impaired cardiac autonomic control. Amongst the cardiovascular dysfunctions resulting from OSA, we can find systemic hypertension and blood pressure dysregulation (elevated blood pressure, or variability of the blood pressure for example). The variability of the blood pressure has been shown to be correlated with the severity of the symptoms such as the frequency of the apnea and hypopnea. Pulmonary hypertension is also common amongst the cardiovascular problems resulting from OSA. Children with obstructive sleep-disordered breathing also show a faster heart rate during wakefulness and during sleep.

In adult patients, OSA has been shown to be associated with insulin resistance. In children, metabolic consequences of OSA are complicated to assess as they can also be associated to puberty and obesity (if present). However, when OSA is associated with obesity, the interaction of the two conditions can lead to metabolic disturbances such as insulin resistance and altered lipidemia, liver disease, abdominal adiposity and metabolic syndrome. Obesity interact with those effects.

Nocturnal enuresis
Children with OSA also show a higher risk for nocturnal enuresis and it is hypothesized to be caused by an excessive production of urine, impaired performance of the bladder and urethra or an inability to suppress the nocturnal bladder contraction, due to a failure to arouse. The risk for nocturnal enuresis increases with the severity of the sleep-disordered breathing: the more respiratory events per hour of sleep, the higher is the risk for nocturnal enuresis. Obesity may also play a role as it is associated with OSA and with nocturnal diuresis (due to unhealthy diet). The interaction between OSA and obesity might thus result in nocturnal enuresis. Considering the high prevalence of nocturnal enuresis amongst children with sleep-disordered breathing, it is important to consider the latter in the differential diagnosis of nocturnal enuresis as the treatment of the sleep disorder might have a favourable therapeutic effect on the enuresis. For example, an adenotonsillectomy performed to reduce OSA has a positive impact on nocturnal enuresis. A study has shown that this surgery has 60–75% chance to resolve the nocturnal enuresis completely, and 80–85% chance to reduce its symptoms alongside others symptoms of OSA.

Other consequences
Contrary to adults, excessive daytime sleepiness (EDS) is not the most commonly reported symptoms in children with OSA. However, using objective questionnaires, it is possible to notice that the frequency of EDS in children is higher than what is reported by the parents or caretakers (40–50%). And the risk for EDS is even increased when OSA is associated with obesity.

Due to all the consequences and symptoms it generates, OSA in children lead to a significant decrease in the quality of life, the decrease being even higher when obesity is present. The quality of life can however be improved with the treatment of OSA. SBD have also been linked to a higher rate of internalizing disorders such as anxiety and depression. Indeed, depressive symptoms have shown to be higher in children with OSA, especially in males. Once again, the severity of depressive symptoms is positively correlated with the severity of the SBD. It also interacts with obesity as obese children have higher risk to show depressive symptoms and obesity can cause OSA. The link can also go the other way around with the depression inducing obesity (due to overeating) which worsens the OSA. Adenotonsillectomy can decrease the intensity of the depressive symptoms.

Other consequences of a disturbed sleep in children with OSA comprise anhedonia increased fatigue and decreased interest in daily activities, which in turn can affect the child's social relationships.

In adults
While there are some similarities between adults and children, OSA does not have the same consequences in both populations. Examples of similarities are the snoring – which is the most common complaint in both pediatric OSA and OSA in adults – variability of blood pressure and cardiovascular morbidities. A major difference is the excessive daytime sleepiness (EDS) which is commonly reported in adult OSA, while it is not very common in pediatric OSA. Nevertheless, OSA in adults also implies a large scope of adverse and serious consequences, the latter leading to higher mortality amongst OSA patients. Those consequences are even worsened by common morbidities such as obesity.

Neurocognitive consequences
Similarly to children, OSA affects cognitive functions in adults. Meta-analysis have shown that the most common cognitive impairments happen in the domains of attention, verbal and visual delayed long-term memory, visuospatial/constructional abilities and executive functions, such as mental flexibility. The executive functioning – mainly dominated by the prefrontal cortex – being significantly impaired in patients with OSA, it is believed that the prefrontal region and its connectivity are affected by sleep disorders.

Regarding memory deficits, verbal memory is significantly impaired as patients show difficulties in recalling verbal information immediately as well as with a delay. While meta-analysis have shown no deficits in retention of information for patients with OSA, those impairment in verbal memory may be linked to problems in encoding information. This deficit in encoding of information is also noticed in visuo-spatial memory; however, the visual memory seems to be intact in OSA patients.

The cognitive impairments have been suggested to be resulting from sleep fragmentation and sleep deprivation, as well as the excessive daytime sleepiness associated with them. More precisely, attention and memory deficits seem to result from sleep fragmentation, while deficits in global cognitive function (executive function, psychomotor function, language abilities) are more related to hypoxia or hypercarbia which accompanies the obstructive events during sleep. However, no consistent correlation has been found between the degree of cognitive impairment and the severity of the sleep disturbance or hypoxia.
These impairments may improve with an effective treatment for OSA, such as continuous positive airway pressure (CPAP) therapy. Driving a motor vehicle is an example of a complex task that relies on driver's cognitive abilities, such as attention, reaction time and vigilance. Very brief moments of inattention called microsleep events could be an indicator for daytime vigilance impairment, although these may not be present in all drivers with obstructive sleep apnea.

Behavioral consequences
The hyperactivity and difficulties in emotional regulation found in pediatric patients (children) are not reported in adults. OSA in adults is nevertheless associated with personality changes and automatic behavior. The biggest impact of OSA is the excessive daytime sleepiness (EDS), reported in approximately 30% of OSA patients. EDS can be caused by the disturbance of sleep quality, the insufficient sleep duration or the sleep fragmentation and it is responsible for further complications as it may lead to depressive symptoms, impairments of social life and decreased effectiveness at work. Studies have shown that those consequences of EDS can be improved following a CPAP treatment.

Physiological and metabolic consequences
OSA in adults is associated with a higher risk for cardiovascular morbidities, diabetes, hypertension, coronary artery disease and stroke – OSA might have a role in the etiology of these conditions. Those conditions may lead to increased mortality that an appropriate treatment for OSA may reduce. OSA is often linked with hypertension as it induces an increase in sympathetic activity that can lead to the elevation of blood pressure. The OSA-related hypercapnia has been suggested to be related to this development of hypertension. Treating the OSA may prevent the development of hypertension.
The relationship between OSA and excess body weight is complex as obesity is more prevalent amongst OSA patients but can also be a risk factor for the development of OSA – it accounts for 58% of adult cases. Thus, both OSA and obesity (when present) may work synergistically and lead to hyperlipidemia, diabetes, insulin resistance and other symptoms of the metabolic syndrome. The metabolic syndrome itself is often associated with OSA: 74–85% of OSA patients are diagnosed with it. CPAP therapy can lead to an improvement of some of the cardiovascular component of the metabolic syndrome while weight loss is also recommended for its positive effects on OSA consequences and metabolic dysfunctions. An intervention comprising exercise and diet is thus effective for the treatment of OSA as it positively impacts the severity of both obesity symptoms and OSA symptoms.

Individuals with Type 2 diabetes are often co-diagnosed with OSA, where Type 2 diabetes prevalence rates range between 15% to 30% within the OSA population. The relationship between OSA and Type 2 diabetes could possibly be explained by the fact that OSA-characteristic fragmented sleep and irregular hypoxemia leads to the dysregulated metabolism of glucose in the blood. In particular, many polysomnography studies showed that OSA left untreated worsens glycemic control in individuals with Type 2 diabetes. However, it is possible that the relationship between OSA and Type 2 diabetes is bidirectional since diabetes-related nerve dysfunction may affect the respiratory system and induce breathing disturbances during sleep.

Psychological consequences
Sleep is of major importance for psychological and emotional health. As it is greatly impaired in OSA, this condition is associated with mood disorders and several psychological outcomes, especially depression and anxiety. Therefore, psychological disorders are commonly observed in OSA patients who show a higher prevalence of psychological distress, mostly due to the impaired sleep quality and structure and the repeated episodes of hypoxia. The presence of psychological disorders may also worsen the sleep disorders which implies that the psychopathology may either be a factor or a consequence of the OSA. The adverse consequences of OSA such as cardiovascular comorbidities and metabolic disturbances also play a role on the development of mental disorders, and patients with chronic condition have also been reported to have higher risk to experience depression. In OSA patients with psychiatric disorders, it is crucial to treat the OSA as it may reduce the psychiatric symptoms.

Some cases of OSA are caused by nasal obstruction which has also been related to psychological problems due to an altered ratio of calcium and magnesium in brain cells. Nasal obstruction can thus aggravate the psychological health of OSA patients. Nasal surgery for those patients might decrease the OSA severity and improve the psychological symptoms.

Other consequences
Untreated OSA also leads to a decreased quality of life, difficulties in social functioning, occupational problems and accidents and a greatly increased rate of vehicle accidents. Those serious outcomes of OSA are mostly related to the excessive daytime sleepiness resulting from the sleep fragmentation and highlight the need to provide the patients with appropriate treatment. Effective treatment majorly improves those adverse consequences, including quality of life.

OSA patients also frequently report pain disorders such as headache or fibromyalgia, OSA patients showing an increased pain intensity alongside a decreased pain tolerance.

Diagnosis

In a systematic review of published evidence, the United States Preventive Services Task Force in 2017 concluded that there was uncertainty about the accuracy or clinical utility of all potential screening tools for OSA, and recommended that evidence is insufficient to assess the balance of benefits and harms of screening for OSA in asymptomatic adults.

The diagnosis of OSA syndrome is made when the patient shows recurrent episodes of partial or complete collapse of the upper airway during sleep resulting in apneas or hypopneas, respectively. Criteria defining an apnea or a hypopnea vary. The American Academy of Sleep Medicine (AASM) defines an apnea as a reduction in airflow of ≥ 90% lasting at least 10 seconds. A hypopnea is defined as a reduction in airflow of ≥ 30% lasting at least 10 seconds and associated with a ≥ 4% decrease in pulse oxygenation, or as a ≥ 30% reduction in airflow lasting at least 10 seconds and associated either with a ≥ 3% decrease in pulse oxygenation or with an arousal.

To define the severity of the condition, the Apnea-Hypopnea Index (AHI) or the Respiratory Disturbance Index (RDI) are used. While the AHI measures the mean number of apneas and hypopneas per hour of sleep, the RDI adds to this measure the respiratory effort-related arousals (RERAs). The OSA syndrome is thus diagnosed if the AHI is > 5 episodes per hour and results in daytime sleepiness and fatigue or when the RDI is ≥ 15 independently of the symptoms. According to the American Association of Sleep Medicine, daytime sleepiness is determined as mild, moderate and severe depending on its impact on social life. Daytime sleepiness can be assessed with the Epworth Sleepiness Scale (ESS), a self-reported questionnaire on the propensity to fall asleep or doze off during daytime. Screening tools for OSA itself comprise the STOP questionnaire, the Berlin questionnaire and the STOP-BANG questionnaire which has been reported as being a very powerful tool to detect OSA.

Criteria

According to the International Classification of Sleep Disorders, there are 4 types of criteria. The first one concerns sleep – excessive sleepiness, nonrestorative sleep, fatigue or insomnia symptoms. The second and third criteria are about respiration – waking with breath holding, gasping, or choking; snoring, breathing interruptions or both during sleep. The last criterion revolved around medical issues as hypertension, coronary artery disease, stroke, heart failure, atrial fibrillation, type 2 diabetes mellitus, mood disorder or cognitive impairment. Two levels of severity are distinguished, the first one is determined by a polysomnography or home sleep apnea test demonstrating 5 or more predominantly obstructive respiratory events per hour of sleep and the higher levels are determined by 15 or more events. If the events are present less than 5 times per hour, no obstructive sleep apnea is diagnosed.

A considerable night-to-night variability further complicates diagnosis of OSA. In unclear cases, multiple testing might be required to achieve an accurate diagnosis.

Polysomnography

Nighttime in-laboratory Level 1 polysomnography (PSG) is the gold standard test for diagnosis. Patients are monitored with EEG leads, pulse oximetry, temperature and pressure sensors to detect nasal and oral airflow, respiratory impedance plethysmography or similar resistance belts around the chest and abdomen to detect motion, an ECG lead, and EMG sensors to detect muscle contraction in the chin, chest, and legs. A hypopnea can be based on one of two criteria. It can either be a reduction in airflow of at least 30% for more than 10 seconds associated with at least 4% oxygen desaturation or a reduction in airflow of at least 30% for more than 10 seconds associated with at least 3% oxygen desaturation or an arousal from sleep on EEG.

An "event" can be either an apnea, characterized by complete cessation of airflow for at least 10 seconds, or a hypopnea in which airflow decreases by 50 percent for 10 seconds or decreases by 30 percent if there is an associated decrease in the oxygen saturation or an arousal from sleep. To grade the severity of sleep apnea, the number of events per hour is reported as the apnea-hypopnea index (AHI). An AHI of less than 5 is considered normal. An AHI of 5–15 is mild; 15–30 is moderate, and more than 30 events per hour characterizes severe sleep apnea.

Home oximetry
In patients who are at high likelihood of having OSA, a randomized controlled trial found that home oximetry (a non-invasive method of monitoring blood oxygenation) may be adequate and easier to obtain than formal polysomnography. High probability patients were identified by an Epworth Sleepiness Scale (ESS) score of 10 or greater and a Sleep Apnea Clinical Score (SACS) of 15 or greater. Home oximetry, however, does not measure apneic events or respiratory event-related arousals and thus does not produce an AHI value.

Treatment 
The treatment of OSAS depends upon the level of obstruction, if the obstruction is at nose or epiglottis a surgery could be required depending on the condition. Numerous treatment options are used in obstructive sleep apnea. Avoiding alcohol and smoking is recommended, as is avoiding medications that relax the central nervous system (for example, sedatives and muscle relaxants). Weight loss is recommended in those who are overweight. Continuous positive airway pressure (CPAP) and mandibular advancement devices are often used and found to be equally effective. Physical training, even without weight loss, improves sleep apnea. There is insufficient evidence to support widespread use of medications. In selected patients, e.g. with tonsillar hyperplasia tonsillectomy is recommended. In patients failing CPAP and oral appliances, surgical treatment with conservative uvulopalatopharyngoplasty (UPPP) as salvage surgery is recommended. Randomized controlled studies of the efficacy of UPPP are published, showing effect on nocturnal respiration and excessive daytime sleepiness, and a systematic Meta-analysis.

Physical intervention 
The most widely used therapeutic intervention is positive airway pressure whereby a breathing machine pumps a controlled stream of air through a mask worn over the nose, mouth, or both. The additional pressure holds open the relaxed muscles. There are several variants:
 Continuous positive airway pressure (CPAP) is effective for both moderate and severe disease. It is the most common treatment for obstructive sleep apnea.
 Variable positive airway pressure (VPAP) (also known as bilevel (BiPAP or BPAP)) uses an electronic circuit to monitor the patient's breathing and provides two different pressures, a higher one during inhalation and a lower pressure during exhalation. This system is more expensive and is sometimes used with patients who have other coexisting respiratory problems or who find breathing out against an increased pressure to be uncomfortable or disruptive to their sleep.
 Nasal EPAP, which is a bandage-like device placed over the nostrils that utilizes a person's own breathing to create positive airway pressure to prevent obstructed breathing.
 Automatic positive airway pressure, also known as "Auto CPAP", incorporates pressure sensors and monitors the person's breathing.
 A 5% reduction in weight among those with moderate to severe OSA may decrease symptoms similarly to CPAP.

Encouraging people with moderate to severe OSA to use CPAP devices can be challenging as their use often requires a behavioural change in sleeping habits. 8% of people who use CPAP devices stop using them after the first night, and 50% of people with moderate to severe OSA stop using their devices in the first year. Educational initiatives and supportive interventions to help improve compliance with CPAP therapy have been shown to improve the length of time people who need CPAP therapy use their devices.

Oral appliances or splints are often preferred but may not be as effective as CPAP. This device is a mouthguard similar to those used in sports to protect the teeth. It is designed to hold the lower jaw slightly down and forward relative to the natural, relaxed position. This position holds the tongue farther away from the back of the airway and may be enough to relieve apnea or improve breathing.

Many people benefit from sleeping at a 30-degree elevation of the upper body or higher, as if in a recliner. Doing so helps prevent the gravitational collapse of the airway. Sleeping on a side as opposed to sleeping on the back is also recommended.

Some studies have suggested that playing a wind instrument may reduce snoring and apnea incidents. This may be especially true of double reed instruments.

Rapid Palatal Expansion

In children, orthodontic treatment to expand the volume of the nasal airway, such as nonsurgical Rapid Palatal expansion is common.

Since the palatal suture is fused in adults, regular RPE using tooth-borne expanders cannot be performed. Mini-implant assisted rapid palatal expansion (MARPE) has been recently developed as a non-surgical option for the transverse expansion of the maxilla in adults. This method increases the volume of the nasal cavity and nasopharynx, leading to increased airflow and reduced respiratory arousals during sleep. Changes are permanent with minimal complications.

Surgery 
Surgical treatments to modify airway anatomy, known as sleep surgery, are varied and must be tailored to the specific airway obstruction needs of a patient. Surgery is not considered a first line treatment for obstructive sleep apnea in adults. There are prospective, randomized, comparative clinical trials, and also a systematic Meta-analysis, showing evidence that conservative uvulopalatopharyngoplasty (UPPP) with or without tonsillectomy is effective in selected patients failing conservative treatment. For those with obstructive sleep apnea unable or unwilling to comply with first line treatment, the surgical intervention has to be adapted to an individual's specific anatomy and physiology, personal preference and disease severity. Uvulopalatopharyngoplasty with or without is the most common surgery for patients with obstructive sleep apnea. Studies have shown that treatment effect of tonsillectomy increases with tonsil size. However, there is little randomized clinical trial evidence for other types of sleep surgery.

There are a number of different operations that may be performed:

 Septoplasty is a corrective surgical procedure for Nasal septum deviation in which the nasal septum is straightened.
 Tonsillectomy or adenoidectomy in an attempt to increase the size of the airway.
 Removal or reduction of parts of the soft palate and some or all of the uvula, such as uvulopalatopharyngoplasty (UPPP) or laser-assisted uvulopalatoplasty (LAUP). Modern variants of this procedure sometimes use radiofrequency waves to heat and remove tissue.
 Turbinectomy is a surgical procedure in which all or some of the turbinate bones are removed to relieve nasal obstruction.
 Reduction of the tongue base, either with laser excision or radiofrequency ablation.
 Genioglossus advancement, in which a small portion of the lower jaw that attaches to the tongue is moved forward, to pull the tongue away from the back of the airway.
 Hyoid suspension, in which the hyoid bone in the neck, another attachment point for tongue muscles, is pulled forward in front of the larynx.
 Maxillomandibular advancement

In the morbidly obese, a major loss of weight (such as what occurs after bariatric surgery) can sometimes cure the condition.

OSA in children is often due to enlarged tonsils and adenoids because the lymphoid tissue grows fast during young age. Surgical removal of enlarged tonsils (tonsillectomy) and the adenoid (adenoidectomy) are first line treatment among children with OSA. The operation is a common procedure but in the most extreme cases, children with severe OSA requires special precautions before, surgery (see "Surgery and obstructive sleep apnea syndrome" below). In some countries, a milder surgical procedure called tonsillotomy is used to remove the protruding tonsillar tissue, a method associated with less pain and lower risk of postoperative hemorrhage.

Neurostimulation 
For patients who cannot use a continuous positive airway pressure device, the U.S. Food and Drug Administration in 2014 granted pre-market approval for an upper airway stimulation system that senses respiration and delivers mild electrical stimulation to the hypoglossal nerve in order to increase muscle tone at the back of the tongue so it will not collapse over the airway. The device includes a handheld patient controller to allow it to be switched on before sleep and is powered by an implantable pulse generator, similar to one used for cardiac rhythm management. Approval for this active implantable neuromodulation device was preceded by a clinical trial whose results were published in the New England Journal of Medicine.

Radiofrequency ablation 
Radiofrequency ablation (RFA), which is conceptually analogous in some ways to surgery, uses low frequency (300 kHz to 1 MHz) radio wave energy to target tissue, causing coagulative necrosis. RFA achieves its effects at 40 °C to 70 °C unlike other electrosurgical devices which require 400 °C to 600 °C for efficacy.

Subsequent evaluations of safety and efficacy have led to the recognition of RFA by the American Academy of Otolaryngology as a somnoplasty treatment option in selected situations for mild to moderate OSA, but the evidence was judged insufficient for routine adoption by the American College of Physicians.

RFA has some potential advantages in carefully selected medical settings, such as intolerance to the CPAP device. For example, when adherence is defined as greater than four hours of nightly use, 46% to 83% of patients with obstructive sleep apnea are non-adherent with CPAP for a variety of reasons, including discomfort while sleeping.

RFA is usually performed in an outpatient setting, using either local anesthetics or conscious sedation anesthesia, the procedure itself typically lasting under 3 minutes. The targeted tissue, such as tongue or palate, is usually approached through the mouth without the need for incisions, although occasionally the target is approached through the neck using assisted imaging. If the tongue is being targeted, this can be done from either dorsal or ventral side. Complications include ulceration, infection, nerve weakness or numbness and swelling. These complications occur in less than 1% of procedures.

Medications 
Evidence is insufficient to support the use of medications to treat obstructive sleep apnea. This includes the use of fluoxetine, paroxetine, acetazolamide, and tryptophan among others.

Recent studies are trying to investigate cannabinoids as a treatment for OSA, especially dronabinol which is a synthetic form of THC (delta-9-tetrahydrocannabinol). Cannabis is known to influence sleep, for example it can reduce sleep onset latency, however, results are not consistent. Studies about dronabinol have shown positive impact on the OSA, as they observed a reduced AHI (Apnea-Hypopnea Index) and an increased self-reported sleepiness (the objective sleepiness being unaffected). However, more evidence are needed as many effects of those substances remain unknown, especially the effects of a long-term intake. The effect on sleepiness and weight gain are particularly of concern. Because of uncertainty about its effects and a lack of consistent evidence, the American Academy of Sleep Medicine does not approve the use of medical cannabis for the treatment of OSA.

Oral appliances / functional orthopedic appliances 
Evidence to support oral appliances/functional orthopedic appliances in children is insufficient with very low evidence of effect. However, the oral appliances/functional orthopedic appliances may be considered in specified cases as an auxiliary in the treatment of children who have craniofacial anomalies which are risk factors of apnea.

Prognosis

Stroke and other cardiovascular diseases are related to OSA, and those under the age of 70 have an increased risk of early death. Persons with sleep apnea have a 30% higher risk of heart attack or death than those unaffected. In severe and prolonged cases, increased in pulmonary pressures are transmitted to the right side of the heart. This can result in a severe form of congestive heart failure known as cor pulmonale. Diastolic function of the heart also becomes affected. Elevated arterial pressure (i.e., hypertension) can be a consequence of OSA syndrome. When hypertension is caused by OSA, it is distinctive in that, unlike most cases (so-called essential hypertension), the readings do not drop significantly when the individual is sleeping (non-dipper) or even increase (inverted dipper).

Without treatment, the sleep deprivation and lack of oxygen caused by sleep apnea increases health risks such as cardiovascular disease, aortic disease (e.g. aortic aneurysm), high blood pressure, stroke, diabetes, clinical depression, weight gain, obesity, and even death.

OSA is associated with cognitive impairment, including deficits in inductive and deductive reasoning, attention, vigilance, learning, executive functions, and episodic and working memory. OSA is associated with increased risk for developing mild cognitive impairment and dementia, and has been associated with neuroanatomical changes (reductions in volumes of the hippocampus, and gray matter volume of the frontal and parietal lobes) which can however be at least in part reversed with CPAP treatment.

Epidemiology
Until the 1990s, little was known regarding the frequency of OSA. A recent meta-analysis of 24 epidemiological studies on the prevalence of OSA in the general population aged 18 and older revealed that for ≥ 5 apnea events per hour, OSA prevalence ranged from 9% to 38%, specifically ranging from 13% to 33% in men and 6% to 19% in women, while in the population aged 65 and older, OSA prevalence was as high as 84%, including 90% in men and 78% in women. Nevertheless, for ≥ 15 apnea events per hour, OSA prevalence ranged from 6% to 17%, and almost 49% prevalence in the older population aged 65 and older. Moreover, a higher BMI is also linked to a higher prevalence of OSA, where a 10% increase in body weight led to a 6-fold risk of OSA in obese men and women.

However, OSA is underdiagnosed as it is not always accompanied by daytime sleepiness which can leave the sleep-disordered breathing unnoticed. The prevalence of OSA with daytime sleepiness is thus estimated to affect 3% to 7% of men and 2% to 5% of women, and the disease is common in both developed and developing countries. OSA prevalence increases with age and is most commonly diagnosed in individuals over 65 years old, with estimations ranging from 22.1% to 83.6%. The prevalence has drastically increased in recent decades due to the incidence of obesity.

Men are more affected by OSA than women, but the phenomenology differs between both genders. Snoring and witnessed apnea are more frequent among men but insomnia for example is more frequent among women. The OSA frequency increase with age for the women. The mortality is higher for women.

Some studies report that it is more frequent among the Hispanic and African American population than among the white population.

If studied carefully in a sleep lab by polysomnography (formal "sleep study"), it is believed that approximately 1 in 5 American adults would have at least mild OSA.

Research
Neurostimulation is being studied as a method of treatment. An implanted hypoglossal nerve stimulation system received European CE Mark (Conformité Européenne) approval in March 2012. Also being studied are exercises of the muscles around the mouth and throat through activities such as playing the didgeridoo.

See also 

Congenital central hypoventilation syndrome
Obesity hypoventilation syndrome
Periodic breathing
Respiratory disturbance index (RDI)
Upper airway resistance syndrome

References 

Sleep disorders